Glenn M. Merkosky (born April 8, 1960) is a Canadian former professional ice hockey player who played 66 games in the National Hockey League. He played with the New Jersey Devils, Hartford Whalers, and Detroit Red Wings. Merkosky was born in Edmonton, Alberta.

After retiring as a player became head coach of the Ontario Hockey League's Sudbury Wolves and then of the American Hockey League's Adirondack Red Wings. Since 1999 he has been working as a pro scout for the Detroit Red Wings.

Career statistics

Regular season and playoffs

External links
 

1960 births
Living people
Adirondack Red Wings players
Binghamton Whalers players
Calgary Wranglers (WHL) players
Canadian ice hockey forwards
Detroit Red Wings players
Detroit Red Wings scouts
Hartford Whalers players
Kamloops Chiefs players
Maine Mariners players
Michigan Tech Huskies men's ice hockey players
New Jersey Devils players
Seattle Breakers players
Ice hockey people from Edmonton
Starbulls Rosenheim players
Undrafted National Hockey League players
Wichita Wind players